Edmond Santa Fe High School is a public high school located in Edmond, Oklahoma, United States. Founded in 1993, Santa Fe is one of three traditional high schools in the Edmond Public Schools district, along with Edmond Memorial High School and Edmond North High School. The school's mascot is the Wolf and the school colors are forest green and gray.

History
The high school opened in 1993 along with Edmond North High School. In its first year, Santa Fe had only freshman and sophomore students; those initial sophomores were the school's first graduating class in 1996. It was recognized as a Blue Ribbon School of Excellence by No Child Left Behind in the 2011–2012 school year.

Athletics
Santa Fe's athletic teams are nicknamed the Wolves.

Performing arts
The school fields two competitive show choirs, "Finale" (Mixed) and "Serenade" (Treble) which have won competitions in Oklahoma. The school also hosts an annual competition.

Santa Fe also has a competitive marching band.

Notable alumni
Jared Allen, professional football player
Clayton Blackburn, professional baseball player
Ty Hensley, professional baseball player
Mike Kennerty, member of the rock band The All American Rejects
Obi Muonelo, professional basketball player
Josh Richardson, professional basketball player
Reggie Smith, professional football player
Laura Spencer, actress
Ekpe Udoh, professional basketball player
Brandon Weeden, professional football and baseball player
Brandon Whitaker, Canadian football player

References

External links
Edmond Santa Fe High School website
Edmond Public Schools website

Public high schools in Oklahoma
Schools in Oklahoma County, Oklahoma
Edmond, Oklahoma
1993 establishments in Oklahoma
Educational institutions established in 1993